Ali Zaky (1930 – 12 March 2005) was an Egyptian gymnast. He competed at the 1948 Summer Olympics and the 1952 Summer Olympics.

References

1930 births
2005 deaths
Egyptian male artistic gymnasts
Olympic gymnasts of Egypt
Gymnasts at the 1948 Summer Olympics
Gymnasts at the 1952 Summer Olympics
20th-century Egyptian people